University of Health Sciences may refer to:
Dow University of Health Sciences
Hyogo University of Health Sciences
Kalpana Chawla University of Health Sciences
Maharashtra University of Health Sciences
National University of Health Sciences
Dr. NTR University of Health Sciences
University of Health Sciences Antigua
University of Health Sciences (Cambodia)
University of Health Sciences, Lahore
University of Health Sciences (Turkey)
West Bengal University of Health Sciences
Western University of Health Sciences